Strzelce Opolskie Town Hall - a Neo-Gothic building built between 1844 and 1846, in the location of a former, destroyed by fires town hall. In 1911, the town hall was reconstructed, in 1945 partially destroyed, and subsequently restored in the 1960s. Currently, the town hall is the seat for the Strzelce Opolskie City Council.

References

Strzelce County
City and town halls in Poland